RMS Lady Hawkins was a steam turbine ocean liner. She was one of a class of five sister ships popularly known as "Lady Boats" that Cammell Laird of Birkenhead, England built in 1928 and 1929 for the Canadian National Steamship Company (CNS or CN). The five vessels were Royal Mail Ships that CN operated from Halifax, Nova Scotia and the Caribbean via Bermuda. In 1942 the  sank Lady Hawkins in the North Atlantic, killing 251 of the 322 people aboard.

Building and peacetime service
Cammell Laird of Birkenhead, on the Wirral in England built all five Lady-liners, and completed Lady Hawkins in November 1928.

Lady Hawkins was an oil-burner, with a set of four Cammell Laird steam turbines driving the propeller shafts to her twin screws by single-reduction gearing. She had three passenger decks, and by 1931 she was equipped with a direction finding device.

CN introduced the liners which became known as "Lady Boats" for mail, freight and passenger traffic between Canada, Bermuda and the Caribbean. The company wanted to develop Canadian exports including lumber, and imports to Canada including fruit, sugar and molasses. Each Lady-liner had refrigerated holds for perishable cargo such as fruit, and capacity for 100,000 bunches of bananas. Their hulls were painted white, which then was a relatively new fashion among shipping companies, and confined largely to passenger ships serving tropical or sub-tropical destinations.

, Lady Hawkins and  sailed fortnightly between Halifax and British Guiana via Boston, Bermuda, the Leeward Islands, the Windward Islands and Barbados. In summer the route was extended to the Montreal. CN named each of its five new liners after the wife of an English or British admiral who was noted for his actions in the Caribbean, and who had been knighted or ennobled. Lady Hawkins was named after Katherine, the wife of the Elizabethan Admiral Sir John Hawkins (1532–95).

War service and loss
In January 1942 Lady Hawkins sailed from Montreal for Bermuda and the Caribbean. She called at Halifax and Boston, and by the time she left Boston she was carrying 2,908 tons of general cargo and 213 passengers as well as her complement of 107 officers, crew and DEMS gunners. At least 53 of her passengers were Royal Navy and RNVR personnel, and at least another 55 were civilians, including at least 15 from the British West Indies and four from the USA.

The liner sank in about 30 minutes.

Three of her six lifeboats were damaged, but the other three were launched. One was commanded by her Chief Officer. It had capacity for 63 people but managed to embark 76 survivors. Its occupants could hear more people in the water, but could neither see them in the dark nor take them aboard the overcrowded boat if they had found them.

The boat had no radio transmitter and very limited rations of drinking water, ship's biscuit and condensed milk. It shipped water and needed constant baling, but it had a mast, sail and oars and Chief Officer Percy Kelly set a course west toward the USA's Atlantic coast sea lanes and land. The boat was at sea for five days, in which time five of its occupants died. Then the survivors sighted the Agwilines vessel  and signalled her with a flashlight.  Coamos Master misread the flashes as an enemy submarine preparing to attack, and was going to continue without stopping. It was only when the survivors shone the light on the boat's sail that he correctly understood their signal. Coamo rescued the boat's 71 surviving occupants, landing them at San Juan, Puerto Rico on 28 January.

Of the three lifeboats launched, only Chief Officer Kelly's was found. Including the five who died in that boat, a total of 251 people from Lady Hawkins were lost. They were the ship's master Captain Huntley Giffen, 85 other members of the crew, one DEMS gunner and 164 of her passengers, two of whom were Distressed British Seamen (i.e. survivors from previous sinkings). The 71 survivors whom Coamo rescued were Percy Kelly, 21 crew and 49 passengers.

RMS Lady Drake
Soon after Lady Hawkins sinking, Kelly was promoted to Captain and made Master of one of her sister ships, Lady Drake. Kelly, 141 passengers and 113 of his crew survived and were rescued by the US Navy minesweeper , which landed them on Bermuda.

Awards
On 27 October 1942 two of Lady Hawkins Able Seamen, Ernest Rice and Clarence Squires, were commended in Naval citations. On 22 December 1942 Captain Kelly was awarded the MBE for his leadership in saving lives from Lady Hawkins. He was also awarded Lloyd's War Medal for Bravery at Sea.

Footnotes

References

Sources and further reading

1928 ships
Maritime incidents in January 1942
Ocean liners of Canada
Ships built on the River Mersey
Ships sunk by German submarines in World War II
Steamships of Canada
Steam turbine-powered ships
World War II shipwrecks in the Atlantic Ocean